Cuprate superconductors are a family of high-temperature superconducting materials made of layers of copper oxides (CuO2) alternating with layers of other metal oxides, which act as charge reservoirs. At ambient pressure, cuprate superconductors are the highest temperature superconductors known. However, the mechanism by which superconductivity occurs is still not understood.

History

The first cuprate superconductor was found in 1986 in the non-stoichiometric cuprate lanthanum barium copper oxide by IBM researchers Georg Bednorz and Karl Alex Müller. The critical temperature for this material was 35K, well above the previous record of 23 K. The discovery led to a sharp increase in research on the cuprates, resulting in thousands of publications between 1986 and 2001. Bednorz and Müller were awarded the Nobel Prize in Physics in 1987, only a year after their discovery.

From 1986, many cuprate superconductors were identified, and can be put into three groups on a phase diagram critical temperature vs. oxygen hole content and copper hole content:
lanthanum barium- (LB-CO), Tc=-240 °C (35 K).
yttrium barium- (YB-CO), Tc=-215 °C (93 K).
bismuth strontium calcium- (BiSC-CO), Tc=-180 °C (95 K).
thallium barium calcium- (TBC-CO), Tc=-150 °C (125 K).
mercury barium calcium- (HGBC-CO) 1993, with Tc=-140 °C (133 K), currently the highest cuprate critical temperature.

Structure

Cuprates are layered materials, consisting of superconducting planes of copper oxide, separated by layers containing ions such as lanthanum, barium, strontium, which act as a charge reservoir, doping electrons or holes into the copper-oxide planes. Thus the structure is described as a superlattice of superconducting CuO2 layers separated by spacer layers, resulting in a structure often closely related to the perovskite structure. Superconductivity takes place within the copper-oxide (CuO2) sheets, with only weak coupling between adjacent CuO2 planes, making the properties close to that of a two-dimensional material. Electrical currents flow within the CuO2 sheets, resulting in a large anisotropy in normal conducting and superconducting properties, with a much higher conductivity parallel to the CuO2 plane than in the perpendicular direction.

Critical superconducting temperatures depend on the chemical compositions, cations substitutions and oxygen content. Chemical formulae of superconducting materials generally contain fractional numbers to describe the doping required for superconductivity. There are several families of cuprate superconductors which can be categorized by the elements they contain and the number of adjacent copper-oxide layers in each superconducting block. For example, YBCO and BSCCO can alternatively be referred to as Y123 and Bi2201/Bi2212/Bi2223 depending on the number of layers in each superconducting block (n). The superconducting transition temperature has been found to peak at an optimal doping value (p=0.16) and an optimal number of layers in each superconducting block, typically n=3.

The undoped "parent" or "mother" compounds are Mott insulators with long-range antiferromagnetic order at sufficiently low temperatures. Single band models are generally considered to be enough to describe the electronic properties.

Cuprate superconductors usually feature copper oxides in both the oxidation states 3+ and 2+. For example, YBa2Cu3O7 is described as Y3+(Ba2+)2(Cu3+)(Cu2+)2(O2−)7. The copper 2+ and 3+ ions tend to arrange themselves in a checkerboard pattern, a phenomenon known as charge ordering. All superconducting cuprates are layered materials having a complex structure described as a superlattice of superconducting CuO2 layers separated by spacer layers, where the misfit strain between different layers and dopants in the spacers induce a complex heterogeneity that in the superstripes scenario is intrinsic for high-temperature superconductivity.

Superconducting Mechanism 

Superconductivity in the cuprates is considered unconventional and is not explained by BCS theory. Possible pairing mechanisms for cuprate superconductivity continue to be the subject of considerable debate and further research. Similarities between the low-temperature antiferromagnetic state in undoped materials and the low-temperature superconducting state that emerges upon doping, primarily the dx2-y2 orbital state of the Cu2+ ions, suggest that electron-phonon coupling is less relevant in cuprates. Recent work on the Fermi surface has shown that nesting occurs at four points in the antiferromagnetic Brillouin zone where spin waves exist and that the superconducting energy gap is larger at these points. The weak isotope effects observed for most cuprates contrast with conventional superconductors that are well described by BCS theory.

In 1987, Philip Anderson proposed that superexchange could act as a high-temperature superconductor pairing mechanism. In 2016, Chinese physicists found a correlation between a cuprate's critical temperature and the size of the charge transfer gap in that cuprate, providing support for the superexchange hypothesis. A 2022 study found that the varying density of actual Cooper pairs in a bismuth strontium calcium copper oxide superconductor matched with numerical predictions based on superexchange.

Applications

BSCCO superconductors already have large-scale applications. For example, tens of kilometers of BSCCO-2223 at 77 K superconducting wires are being used in the current leads of the Large Hadron Collider at CERN. (but the main field coils are using metallic lower temperature superconductors, mainly based on niobium–tin).

See also 
 Thallium barium calcium copper oxide
 Yttrium barium copper oxide
 Lanthanum barium copper oxide
Bismuth strontium calcium copper oxide
 Superconducting wire
Unconventional superconductor

Bibliography
 Rybicki et al, Perspective on the phase diagram of cuprate high-temperature superconductors, University of Leipzig, 2015

References

Copper compounds
Superconductors
Oxides